Namibia (NAM) has competed in the last eight African Games, first appearing in 1991. Athletes from Namibia have won a total of fifty-one medals, including seven gold.

Participation
Namibia gained independence on 1 February 1990 with the introduction of majority rule and end of apartheid. The country attended the next Games in 1991, participating disabled and able-bodied athletes sharing the medals equally. The country's involvement in the African Games is the responsibility of the Namibian Sports Commission which provides funding for participation in the events.

Medal tables

Medals by Games

Below is a table representing all Namibian medals won at the Games.

See also 
 Namibia at the Olympics
 Namibia at the Paralympics
 Sport in Namibia

References